Karawata gustavoi is a species of flowering plant in the family Bromeliaceae, endemic to northeastern Brazil. It was first described in 2001 as Aechmea gustavoi.

References

Bromelioideae
Plants described in 2001